The 2019 Melbourne 400 (known for sponsorship purposes as the Beaurepaires Melbourne 400) was a motor racing event for the Supercars Championship held as a support event to the 2019 Australian Grand Prix from 14 March to 17 March 2019. It was held at the Melbourne Grand Prix Circuit and consisted of two races of 70 kilometres and two races of 130 kilometres. It was the second event of fifteen in the 2019 Supercars Championship and the second running of the Melbourne 400 event.

Tickford Racing's Chaz Mostert won the Larry Perkins Trophy for accumulating the most points over the weekend. The event saw the running of the 1,000th Australian Touring Car Championship race in Race 4, won by DJR Team Penske's Scott McLaughlin. McLaughlin claimed three pole positions and three race wins across the weekend, with the new-for-2019 Ford Mustang GT proving dominant. McLaughlin left the event continuing to hold his championship lead over Jamie Whincup by 31 points.

Report

Background
This event was the second of fifteen in the 2019 Supercars Championship and the second running of the Melbourne 400. Defending series champion Scott McLaughlin held the championship lead entering the event after winning both races at the Adelaide 500.

Practice
Two 30-minute practice sessions were held prior to qualifying on Thursday. Chaz Mostert was fastest in the first session with a margin of 0.4s over Anton de Pasquale with a time of 1:55.5743s. The second session saw DJR Team Penske claim the first two positions with Scott McLaughlin setting a time of 1:54.5518, 0.2s faster than teammate Fabian Coulthard and 0.6s clear of Mostert.

Qualifying
Four 10-minute qualifying sessions were held to decide the grid for each race. Qualifying for Races 3 and 4 was held on Thursday afternoon with McLaughlin claiming pole position for both races. McLaughlin's time of 1:53.8280s in qualifying for Race 3 was a new Supercars lap record, beating teammate Fabian Coulthard's previous lap record by 0.6s. Mostert was left just 22nd in the first session after infringing track limits on his first flying lap. He recovered in qualifying for Race 4 to be second, 0.128s slower than McLaughlin's best time of 1:54.2643s. Jamie Whincup qualified 3rd, ahead of the Ford Mustangs of Cameron Waters, Coulthard and Will Davison. 

Qualifying for Races 5 and 6 was held early Friday afternoon. McLaughlin claimed his 50th career pole position for Race 5 with a time of 1:53.9990s, 0.5s clear of Waters. Shane van Gisbergen was left 12th after making a mistake at the penultimate corner on his second flying lap. Qualifying for Race 6 saw Mostert pip McLaughlin by 0.08s with a time of 1:54.2783s to claim his first pole position since the 2017 Vodafone Gold Coast 600. Whincup qualified 3rd ahead of Waters and van Gisbergen.

Race 3
Race 3 was held on Friday afternoon and consisted of 130 kilometres and 25 laps. McLaughlin converted from his pole position to finish unchallenged ahead of Coulthard and Waters, leading home an all-Mustang top 5. Mostert recovered from his 22nd starting position to finish 5th ahead of the best placed Holden of Tim Slade and James Courtney. Van Gisbergen retired from the race after an engine failure while running fourth with four laps remaining.

A post-race investigation into a pitlane incident in which a tyre from Scott Pye's car was collected by Nick Percat during pitstops on lap 10 resulted in Walkinshaw Andretti United receiving a penalty of 30 team championship points and a fine of $3,000. Rick Kelly received a post-race 43-second time penalty, demoting him to 22nd, after his car was released from the pit bay into the path of James Golding.

Race 4
Race 4 was held early Saturday afternoon and consisted of 70 kilometres and 13 laps. This race was notable as the 1,000th Australian Touring Car Championship race held. McLaughlin led from start to finish to continue his perfect streak of victories, with Mostert in second and Waters in third. Mostert started second but found himself fourth after passes by Waters and Whincup on the opening lap. He recovered to 2nd after passing Whincup on lap 4 and Waters on lap 9.

James Golding received a 5-second time penalty for failing to leave racing room for Andre Heimgartner at the end of the first lap. His Garry Rogers Motorsport teammate Richie Stanaway received the same penalty after a post-race investigation found him guilty of careless driving after contact with Lee Holdsworth. Todd Hazelwood was investigated for twice cutting the Turn 11/Turn 12 complex, but was cleared due to damage from contact with Percat.

Race 5
Race 5 was held late Saturday afternoon and consisted of 130 kilometres and 25 laps. The race started in bizarre circumstances after an out-lap crash between polesitter McLaughlin and second-place qualifier Waters resulted in neither driver starting the race. The incident left Brad Jones Racing's Percat and Slade as the new highest-placed starters. Slade led from the line but was passed by Whincup at Turn 13 on the opening lap. Slade and Percat then made contact at Turn 15, resulting in Percat being escorted wide and falling to seventh. Whincup continued to extend his race lead while Slade fell under pressure from Mostert. Mostert undercut Slade during pitstops and began to pressure Whincup for the effective race lead, eventually passing on lap 14. Mostert continued to extend his lead until a Safety Car was called on lap 20 after van Gisbergen's car lost a wheel. Mostert held the race lead as the race restarted with four laps to go and won the race from Whincup and Slade. David Reynolds finished in fourth ahead of Coulthard and Walkinshaw Andretti United drivers Pye and Courtney. van Gisbergen was classified 22nd and 2 laps down after repairs to his car.

Triple Eight Race Engineering were fined $5,000 and docked 30 teams' championship points as a result of van Gisbergen's wheel loss. Will Davison received a 5 second time penalty, demoting him to 10th, for failing to leave racing room while battling James Golding at Turn 3 on lap 3.  Incidents between Lee Holdsworth and Richie Stanaway were the subject of a post-race investigation. The two drivers first made contact on lap 1, with Stanaway then making contact with the rear of Holdsworth's car on lap 3. Stewards charged Stanaway with dangerous driving and he was disqualified, fined $10,000 and forced to start Race 6 from pitlane.

Race 6
Race 6 was held on Sunday afternoon and consisted of 70 kilometres and 13 laps. The race did not meet the scheduled race distance due to time certainty and finished after 11 laps. The race was won by McLaughlin, leading from start to finish from second on the grid. Polesitter Mostert finished 2nd and Whincup finished 3rd. Van Gisbergen was given a 15-second time penalty after contact with Coulthard at Turn 13 on lap 2. Coulthard fell to 22nd after the contact, recovering to 15th position. The Safety Car was called after a crash between Garry Jacobson and Macauley Jones on lap 4. The accident occurred when Jones was attempting a pass on Simona de Silvestro. Overlap between the rear of Jones' car and the front of Jacobson's car caused Jones to spin into the wall. The race resumed on lap 7 with McLaughlin and Mostert building a comfortable lead over Whincup before the race finish. Mostert won the Larry Perkins Trophy for accumulating the most points over the weekend, with 2018 Larry Perkins Trophy winner Whincup second in the standings.

De Silvestro received a post-race penalty of 5 seconds for careless driving after a last corner pass on James Golding escorted him wide and caused him to hit the wall. Kelly Racing were also docked 50 teams' championship points after it was found in parc ferme that Rick Kelly's car did not have a SD card inserted in its judicial camera. Jacobson, meanwhile, was cleared of wrongdoing after a post-race investigation into the crash with Jones.

Results

Practice

Race 3

Qualifying

Race

Notes
 - Rick Kelly received a 43 second time penalty for an unsafe pit release.

Race 4

Qualifying

Race

Notes
 - Richie Stanaway received a 5 second time penalty for careless driving.
 - James Golding received a 5 second time penalty for careless driving.

Race 5

Qualifying

Race

Notes
 - Will Davison received a five second time penalty for failing to leave racing room.
 - Richie Stanaway was disqualified, fined $10,000 and forced to start Race 6 from pitlane for dangerous driving.

Race 6

Qualifying

Race

Notes
 - Race shortened to 11 laps due to time certainty.
 - Simona de Silvestro received a 5-second time penalty for careless driving.
 - Shane van Gisbergen received a 15-second time penalty for contact with Fabian Coulthard.

References

Melbourne 400
Melbourne 400
Melbourne 400